The 1941 Drake Bulldogs football team was an American football represented Drake University in the Missouri Valley Conference (MVC) during the 1941 college football season. In its ninth season under head coach Vee Green, the team compiled a 4–5–1 record (0–3–1 against MVC opponents), finished in last place in the MVC, and was outscored by a total of 134 to 83. The team played its home games at Drake Stadium in Des Moines, Iowa.

Guard Leonard Adams was selected by the conference coaches as first-team player on the 1941 All-Missouri Valley Conference football team.

Schedule

References

Drake
Drake Bulldogs football seasons
Drake Bulldogs football